Ouled Sassi or Ras El Miaad is a town and commune in Biskra Province, Algeria.

References

Communes of Biskra Province
Cities in Algeria
Algeria